The 2013–14 New Zealand Figure Skating Championships was held at the Dunedin Ice Stadium in Dunedin from 28 September through 1 October 2013. Skaters competed in the disciplines of men's singles, ladies' singles, and ice dancing across many levels, including senior, junior, novice, adult, and the pre-novice disciplines of juvenile, pre-primary, primary, and intermediate.

Senior results

Men

Ladies

Ice dancing

External links
 2013–14 New Zealand Figure Skating Championships results

2013 in figure skating
New Zealand Figure Skating Championships
Figure Skating
September 2013 sports events in New Zealand
October 2013 sports events in New Zealand